The 2017–18 season of the Belgian First Division B began in August 2017 and  ended in April 2018. It was the second season of the First Division B following a change in league format from the old Belgian Second Division. The fixtures were announced near the end of June 2017. Cercle Brugge won the title and promotion on 10 March 2018. Although Tubize lost the relegation play-offs and therefore would have been relegated, they were saved as Lierse went bankrupt.

Team changes

In
 Westerlo were relegated from the 2016–17 Belgian First Division A after finishing in last place.
 Beerschot Wilrijk were promoted as 2016–17 Belgian First Amateur Division winners.

Out
 Antwerp won the promotion play-offs against Roeselare and was thus promoted.
 Lommel United was relegated after they finished last in the relegation play-offs.

Team information

Stadiums and locations

Personnel and kits

Managerial changes

League table

Opening tournament

Closing tournament

Aggregate table

Notes

Promotion play-offs
The winners of the opening tournament and the closing tournament met in a two-legged match to determine the division champion, who promoted to the 2018–19 Belgian First Division A. The team finishing highest in the aggregate table was allowed to play the second leg at home. In case one team had won both the opening and the closing tournament, these matches would not have been played and that team would have been promoted automatically.

On 5 November 2017, Beerschot Wilrijk won the opening tournament and was therefore assured of playing at least the promotion play-offs. The closing tournament was won by Cercle Brugge on 17 February 2018, who played Beerschot Wilrijk for the title and promotion.

The first leg was a closed match with few chances, until Cercle Brugge goalkeeper Paul Nardi made an error in controlling the ball, allowing Euloge Placca Fessou one of the easiest goals of his career. Shortly after, Beerschot Wilrijk saw midfielder Alexander Maes sent off following a harsh tackle, resulting them in controlling the game without creating more chances. In the return match, Cercle Brugge scored twice early and looked on its way to promotion, only for Beerschot Wilrijk to come back to 2–1 just minutes before the end and gaining the advantage on away goals. In a dramatic finish, Cercle Brugge was awarded a last minute penalty kick, converted by Irvin Cardona to bring them back to the highest division where they last played during the 2014–15 season.

Cercle Brugge won 3–2 on aggregate.

Relegation play-offs
The four bottom teams in the aggregate table will take part in the relegation play-offs in which they keep half of the points they collected during the overall regular season (rounded up).  As a result, the teams started with the following points before the playoff: Roeselare 18 points, Union SG 16, Westerlo 14 and Tubize 12 points. The points of Roeselare, Westerlo and Tubize were rounded up, therefore in case of any ties on points at the end of the playoffs, their half point would be deducted. The team finishing in last position will relegate to the 2018–19 Belgian First Amateur Division. 

Following a 0-1 loss at home to Union SG on 14 April 2018, Tubize was mathematically relegated as the deficit to Union SG became six points with only two matches to go, while Union SG would always be ranked above Tubize in case of ties as the points of Tubize were rounded up prior to the relegation play-offs. Tubize was however spared of relegation from the Belgian First Division B as Lierse did not obtain a Belgian professional football license after going bankrupt.

Season statistics

Top scorers

5 goals (5 players)

  Erwin Hoffer (Beerschot Wilrijk)
  Crysan (Cercle Brugge)
  Pierre Bourdin (Lierse)
  Mathieu Cornet (Roeselare)
  Christian Osaguona (Westerlo)

4 goals (5 players)

  Guillaume François (Beerschot Wilrijk)
  Nico Binst (Lierse)
  Mohamed El Gabbas (Lierse)
  Augusto Da Silva (Union SG)
  Maxime Annys (Westerlo)

3 goals (14 players)

  Gianni Bruno (Cercle Brugge)
  Stephen Buyl (Cercle Brugge)
  Jérémy Taravel (Cercle Brugge)
  Andrei Camargo (Lierse)
  Aurélien Joachim (Lierse)
  Mathieu Maertens (OH Leuven)
  Davy Brouwers (Roeselare)
  Raphaël Lecomte (Roeselare)
  Thibaut Van Acker (Roeselare)
  Salomon Nirisarike (Tubize)
  Roman Ferber (Union SG)
  Mathias Fixelles (Union SG)
  Benjamin De Ceulaer (Westerlo)
  Daan Heymans (Westerlo)

2 goals (19 players)

  Alexander Maes (Beerschot Wilrijk)
  Kule Mbombo (Beerschot Wilrijk)
  Lloyd Palun (Cercle Brugge)
  Héctor Rodas (Cercle Brugge)
  Frédéric Frans (Lierse)
  Mégan Laurent (Lierse)
  Elliott Moore (OH Leuven)
  Kenneth Schuermans (OH Leuven)
  Alessandro Cerigioni (Roeselare)
  Emile Samyn (Roeselare)
  Nermin Zolotić (Roeselare)
  Marco Weymans (Tubize)
  Christophe Bertjens (Union SG)
  Kenneth Houdret (Union SG)
  Gertjan Martens (Union SG)
  Pietro Perdichizzi (Union SG)
  Serge Tabekou (Union SG)
  Wouter Corstjens (Westerlo)
  Lukas Van Eenoo (Westerlo)

1 goal (40 players)

  Jimmy De Jonghe (Beerschot Wilrijk)
  Joren Dom (Beerschot Wilrijk)
  Denis Prychynenko (Beerschot Wilrijk)
  Arjan Swinkels (Beerschot Wilrijk)
  Tom Van Hyfte (Beerschot Wilrijk)
  Benjamin Delacourt (Cercle Brugge)
  Jordy Gaspar (Cercle Brugge)
  Benjamin Lambot (Cercle Brugge)
  Wesley Vanbelle (Cercle Brugge)
  Christophe Vincent (Cercle Brugge)
  Sabir Bougrine (Lierse)
  Pierre Bourdin (Lierse)
  Othman Boussaid (Lierse)
  Brice Ntambwe (Lierse)
  Thomas Azevedo (OH Leuven)
  Simon Diedhiou (OH Leuven)
  Julien Gorius (OH Leuven)
  Samy Kehli (OH Leuven)
  Jovan Kostovski (OH Leuven)
  Jarno Libert (OH Leuven)
  Koen Persoons (OH Leuven)
  Derrick Tshimanga (OH Leuven)
  Tony Watt (OH Leuven)
  Saviour Godwin (Roeselare)
  Grégory Grisez (Roeselare)
  Maël Lépicier (Roeselare)
  Marko Maletić (Roeselare)
  Sandro Wieser (Roeselare)
  Ki-wook Hwang (Tubize)
  Emeric Dudouit (Tubize)
  Mohamed Kané (Tubize)
  Hugo Vidémont (Tubize)
  Simon Zenke (Tubize)
  Kevin Kis (Union SG)
  Héritier Luvumbu (Union SG)
  Thibault Peyre (Union SG)
  Maxime Biset (Westerlo)
  Daniel Christensen (Westerlo)
  Noël Soumah (Westerlo)
  Cédric Vangeel (Westerlo)

1 own goal (7 players)

  Jan Van den Bergh (Beerschot Wilrijk, scored for Cercle Brugge)
  Isaac Koné (Cercle Brugge, scored for Beerschot Wilrijk)
  Dimitri Daeseleire (OH Leuven, scored for Westerlo)
  Nick Gillekens (OH Leuven, scored for Roeselare)
  Laurent Lemoine (Roeselare, scored for Union SG)
  Ibrahima Ba (Tubize, scored for OH Leuven)
  Gertjan Martens (Union SG, scored for Tubize)

Number of teams by provinces

Notes

References

Belgian First Division B seasons
Bel
2